Craigsmere is an unincorporated community in Ontonagon County in the U.S. state of Michigan.  The community is located within McMillan Township.

History
Craigsmere was founded in the 1880s by the Craig Lumber Company as a company town.

References

Unincorporated communities in Michigan
Unincorporated communities in Ontonagon County, Michigan